Lieutenant-General Sir Edwin Henry Hayter Collen  (1843–1911) was a British Indian Army officer, who served in the Council of the Viceroy of India.

Background and family
Collen was born in the Marylebone district of London on 17 June 1843, the son of Henry Collen, a miniature portrait painter and early photographer to the court. He married, in 1873, Blanche Rigby, daughter of Charles Rigby, JP, and they had three sons and a daughter.

Army career
Collen joined the Royal Artillery in 1863, and served in Abyssinia in 1868 and later in Afghanistan and Sudan. After passing through Staff college in 1871-72, he joined the Indian Staff Corps. As an administrator in India, he served as Secretary in the Military Department, and was a Military Member of the Council of the Viceroy of India from December 1895 until he retired in April 1901. He was promoted to Major-General on 18 January 1900.

Honours
Collens was knighted as a Knight Commander of the Order of the Indian Empire (KCIE) in the 1893 New Year Honours list, and was promoted to a Knight Grand Commander (GCIE) of the same order in the 1901 New Year Honours list. He was appointed a Companion of the Order of the Bath (CB) in the 1897 Diamond Jubilee Honours list.

Works

References

Sources

1843 births
1911 deaths
Indian Staff Corps officers
Companions of the Order of the Bath
Knights Grand Commander of the Order of the Indian Empire
Royal Artillery officers
British Indian Army generals